Wormley is a village and former civil parish, now in the unparished area of Hoddesdon, in the Broxbourne district, in the county of Hertfordshire, England. The village is part of the census ward of Wormley and Turnford, which had a population of 8,146 at the 2001 census. In 1931 the parish had a population of 930.

Geography
Wormley is located east of the A10 road, which links Cambridge to London, commonly known as the Great Cambridge Road.

Wormley is sandwiched between Broxbourne and Turnford with a high road of shops. It is 1 mile south of Broxbourne, and the nearest railway station is Broxbourne.

Wormley is close to the River Lea which runs from Luton towards Wheathampstead, then south towards London where it meets the River Thames. Wormley Rovers Football Club and Wormley Cricket Club are based at Wormley playing fields. Wormley also has Top Field and Cozens Grove Local Nature Reserve.

History
The name is thought to derive from the Old English "snake-infested leah"; the last element could mean "clearing", or perhaps "woodland pasture". Wormley was one of the manors which were granted by Harold Godwinson to the canons of Waltham Holy Cross. It was entered in the Domesday Book of 1085 as Wermelai, with a total of 28 households. Wormley remained under the control of the monastery until its dissolution in 1540 when it was granted to Sir Edward North. The manor house, called Wormleybury, on the south side of Church Lane, was totally rebuilt in 1734 and remodelled in 1767 and 1782 by Robert Mylne for Sir Abraham Hume. It has a stone portico and steps, with an octagonal bell turret. There is interior decoration of 1779 by Robert Adam. It is a Grade I Listed building.

The parish church of St Lawrence has a nave and font dating from the 12th century. There are several brasses from the 15th century and a marble monument to the Purvy family dated 1617.

There are two coal-tax posts in Wormley, both in unusual locations. One is in the middle of Wormley Wood and the other on the north side of a country lane at a point where it is hard to imagine any significant trade traffic passing by. They were erected following the London Coal and Wine Duties Continuance Act 1861, and thanks to them, many of the bridges across the River Thames were paid for.

On 1 April 1935 the parish was abolished and merged with Hoddesdon and Cheshunt, part also went to form Brickendon Liberty.

Community facilities

St Lawrence's Church forms part of the Parish of Broxbourne with Wormley and is a member of the New River Group Ministry.

Bushby Hall (formerly Wormley Over Sixties Club) on Wharf Road is a community centre which can be hired for functions and is also the venue for ((Bounce)) Wormley. 

Wormley Church of England Primary School was founded in 1864. It had 464 pupils in 2017/18.

In 2014, the area of Wormley and Turnford was awarded £1m from the Big Local Trust to invest in the community over the next 10 years.

Personalities
David Bentley started his footballing career at Wormley Youth Football Club.

References

External links

Wormley High Street as it looked in the past
Wormley coal tax posts

Villages in Hertfordshire
Former civil parishes in Hertfordshire
Hoddesdon